Les Botham (5 May 1930 – 17 April 1999) was an Australian cricketer. He played eight first-class cricket matches for Victoria between 1956 and 1960.

See also
 List of Victoria first-class cricketers

References

External links
 

1930 births
1999 deaths
Australian cricketers
Victoria cricketers
Cricketers from Melbourne